Gwenter is a hamlet in the parish of St Keverne (where the 2011 census population was included), Cornwall, England.

Gwenter lies within the Cornwall Area of Outstanding Natural Beauty (AONB). Almost a third of Cornwall has AONB designation, with the same status and protection as a National Park.

The name Gwenter comes from the Cornish language words gwyns, meaning 'wind', and tir, meaning 'land'.

References

Hamlets in Cornwall
St Keverne